Mark Hartigan (born October 15, 1977) is a Canadian former professional ice hockey centre, who played in the National Hockey League with the Atlanta Thrashers, Columbus Blue Jackets, Anaheim Ducks and the Detroit Red Wings. He currently resides in Fort McMurray, Alberta.

Playing career
Hartigan was signed as an undrafted free agent by the Atlanta Thrashers in 2002, after three seasons of NCAA hockey at St. Cloud State University.  He first played for Atlanta and the Columbus Blue Jackets at the NHL level, and also saw extensive time with their respective AHL franchises, the Chicago Wolves and Syracuse Crunch.

Hartigan was traded to the Anaheim Ducks along with Joe Motzko in exchange for Zenon Konopka and Curtis Glencross, on January 26, 2007. He played in only 6 regular season games and one playoff game during the Ducks' successful run for the Stanley Cup in 2007, therefore his name was not put on the cup. He was, however, awarded a Stanley Cup ring by the team.

On July 16, 2007, Hartigan was signed as a free agent by the Detroit Red Wings, playing 23 regular season games (3G, 1A), and 4 playoff games.  Detroit won the Stanley Cup in 2008.  However Hartigan did not play enough games, and again his name was not put on the Stanley Cup.  He was, however, again given a Stanley Cup ring by the team.

Hartigan played the last four seasons of his career in Europe, before announcing his retirement after his final season with Linköpings HC in the Swedish Elitserien.

Records

St. Cloud State University
Career goals (86)
Goals in a single period (4)
Goals in a single season (37)
Assists in a single season (38–T)
Points in a single season (75)
Short-handed goals in a season (6)

Syracuse Crunch

Passed Lonny Bohonos for the Crunch record for career goals on January 19, 2007.
Career Goals (107)
Longest point streak in franchise history (18 games; December 14, 2005 to February 4, 2006)

Career statistics

Awards and honors

References

External links

1977 births
Living people
Anaheim Ducks players
Atlanta Thrashers players
Canadian ice hockey centres
Chicago Wolves players
Columbus Blue Jackets players
Detroit Red Wings players
Dinamo Riga players
Grand Rapids Griffins players
HC CSKA Moscow players
Ice hockey people from Alberta
Ice hockey people from British Columbia
Linköping HC players
People from Fort St. John, British Columbia
Portland Pirates players
SC Rapperswil-Jona Lakers players
St. Cloud State Huskies men's ice hockey players
Sportspeople from Lethbridge
Syracuse Crunch players
Undrafted National Hockey League players
Weyburn Red Wings players
Canadian expatriate ice hockey players in Latvia
Canadian expatriate ice hockey players in Russia
Canadian expatriate ice hockey players in Switzerland
Canadian expatriate ice hockey players in Sweden
AHCA Division I men's ice hockey All-Americans